A national museum is a museum maintained and funded by a national government. In many countries it denotes a museum run by the central government, while other museums are run by regional or local governments. In other countries a much greater number of museums are run by the central government.   
  
The following is an incomplete list of national museums:

Albania
The Albanian government operates several national museums, including:
 National History Museum (Albania)
 National Museum of Education (Albania)
 National Museum of Medieval Art (Albania)
 Marubi National Museum of Photography

Argentina
The Argentinian Ministry of Culture operates several national museums, including:

Historical House of the Independence Museum
Museo Casa de Rogelio Yrurtia
Museo Mitre
Museo Nacional de Bellas Artes (Buenos Aires)
National Historical Museum (Argentina)
National Museum of Decorative Arts
National Museum of the Cabildo and the May Revolution
Sarmiento Historical Museum

Australia
The Australian Government operates several national museums through its various departments, including:
 Australian National Maritime Museum
 Australian War Memorial
 National Gallery of Australia
 National Museum of Australia
 National Portrait Gallery (Australia)
 Questacon

In addition, a number of states in Australia also operate "national museums". These include:

 National Motor Museum, Birdwood, operated by the government of South Australia
 National Gallery of Victoria, operated by the government of Victoria

Austria
 Kunsthistorisches Museum Vienna
 Natural History Museum, Vienna

Azerbaijan
 National Art Museum of Azerbaijan
 National Museum of History of Azerbaijan

Bahrain
 Bahrain National Museum

Bangladesh
 Bangladesh National Museum

Belarus
 Belarusian National Arts Museum
 Belarusian National History Museum

Belgium
The Federal Public Service for Science Policy Programming in Belgium operates several museum associations:
 Royal Museums of Art and History
 Royal Museums of Fine Arts of Belgium

Bosnia and Herzegovina
 Bosnian and Herzegovinian Museum of Literature
 Historical Museum of Bosnia and Herzegovina
 National Museum of Bosnia and Herzegovina

Brazil
 National Historical Museum, Brazil (Museu Histórico Nacional)
 National Museum of Brazil (Museu Nacional)
 National Museum of Fine Arts (Museu Nacional de Belas Artes)
 National Museum of the Republic (Museu Nacional da República)

Brunei
The government of Brunei operates several museums including:
 Brunei Museum
 Brunei Darussalam Maritime Museum
 Malay Technology Museum
 Royal Regalia Museum

Bulgaria
 National Archaeological Museum
 National Historical Museum
 National Art Gallery
 National Gallery for Foreign Art
 National Museum of Natural History
 Earth and Man National Museum 
 National Museum of Military History
 National Transport Museum

Burkina Faso
 National Museum of Music

Cambodia
 National Museum of Cambodia
 Angkor National Museum

Canada
The following are national museums of Canada, established by the federal government of Canada and operated through an autonomous Crown corporation:
 Canada Agriculture and Food Museum
 Canada Aviation and Space Museum
 Canada Science and Technology Museum
 Canadian Museum for Human Rights
 Canadian Museum of History
 Canadian Museum of Immigration at Pier 21
 Canadian Museum of Nature
 Canadian War Museum
 National Gallery of Canada
 Virtual Museum of New France

Former national museums that were later shut down includes:
 Canadian Museum of Contemporary Photography 
 Canadian Postal Museum

In addition to institutions established or operated by the Government of Canada, several provinces and territories have established their own provincial and territorial museums.

Chad
 Chad National Museum (Musee National N'Djamena)

Chile
 National Air and Space Museum (Santiago)
 National History Museum (Santiago)
 National Museum of Fine Arts (Santiago)
 National Museum of Natural History (Santiago)

China
 National Art Museum of China
 Palace Museum
 Beijing Museum of Natural History
 National Museum of China
 Henan Museum

Colombia
 Colombian National Museum

Comoros
 National Museum of Comoros

Costa Rica
 National Museum of Costa Rica

Cyprus
 Cyprus Museum

Czech Republic
 National Gallery Prague
 National Museum, Prague

Denmark
 National Museum of Denmark

Djibouti
 Djibouti Museum

Eritrea
 National Museum of Eritrea

Estonia
 Art Museum of Estonia
 Estonian National Museum

Ethiopia
 National Museum of Ethiopia

Finland
 Ateneum
 Finnish Museum of Natural History
 Kiasma
 National Museum of Finland
 Sinebrychoff Art Museum

France
 Centre Georges Pompidou (Musée National d'Art Moderne)
 Musée de l'Armée
 Musée Camille Claudel
 Musée de Cluny - National Museum of the Middle-Ages (Musée National du Moyen-Age)
 Musée du Louvre
 Museum of European and Mediterranean Civilisations (MuCEM)
 Musée d'Orsay
 Museum of Air and Space (Musée de l'Air et de l'Espace)
 Museum of Natural History (Muséum national d'histoire naturelle)
 Museum of Science and Industry (Cité des Sciences et de l'Industrie)
 National Navy Museum (Musée national de la Marine)
 National Railway Museum (Musée Français du Chemin de Fer)

Gambia
 National Museum

Germany
 Bavarian National Museum
 German Historical Museum
 German Museum of Technology (Deutsches Technikmuseum Berlin)
 German National Museum (Germanisches Nationalmuseum)
 Glyptothek
 The Max Planck Institutes
 Modern Art Museum (Pinakothek der Moderne)
 Museum Wiesbaden
 National Gallery
 National Museum of Germany  (Deutsches Museum)
 New Pinakothek (Neue Pinakothek)
 Old Pinakothek (Alte Pinakothek)

Ghana
 National Museum of Ghana

Greece
 Athens War Museum
National Archaeological Museum, Athens
 National Gallery
National Historical Museum, Athens
 State Museum of Contemporary Arts

Guatemala
 Museo Nacional de Arte Moderno "Carlos Mérida"

Guyana
 National Museum of Guyana

Holy See (Vatican City)
 Vatican Museums
 Vatican Library
 Vatican Secret Archives
 Saint Peter's Basilica
 Apostolic Palace
 Archbasilica of Saint John Lateran
 Sistine Chapel

Hong Kong
 Hong Kong Museum of History
 Hong Kong Heritage Museum

Hungary
 Hungarian National Museum
 Hungarian National Gallery

Iceland
 National Gallery of Iceland
 National Museum of Iceland

Isle of Man
 Manx National Heritage (Eiraght Ashoonagh Vannin)

India
National-level museums in India come directly under the administrative control of Ministry of Culture, Government of India.

 National Museum, New Delhi
 Chhatrapati Shivaji Maharaj Vastu Sangrahalaya
 Indian Museum
 Government Museum, Mathura
 National Gallery of Modern Art
 Allahabad Museum
 Government Museum, Chennai
 Salar Jung Museum
 Dr. Bhau Daji Lad Museum
 Government Museum and Art Gallery, Chandigarh
 City Palace, Jaipur
 City Palace, Udaipur
 National Handicrafts and Handlooms Museum
 Victoria Memorial
 Jaisalmer War Museum
 Hazarduari Palace
 Sabarmati Ashram
 Cavalry Tank Museum, Ahmednagar
 National Rail Museum, New Delhi
 Railway Museum, Mysore
 Albert Hall Museum
 Madame Tussauds Delhi
 23 science centers under the National Council of Science Museums
 44 site museums under the Archaeological Survey of India

Indonesia
Museums listed below are operated by Ministry of Education, Culture, Research, and Technology and other ministries.
 National Museum of Indonesia
 Basoeki Abdullah Museum
 Formulation of Proclamation Text Museum
 Fort Vredeburg Museum
 Museum of National Awakening
 National Gallery of Indonesia
 National Press Monument
 Some government-operated museums in Taman Mini Indonesia Indah
 Youth Pledge Museum

Iran
 National Museum of Iran

Iraq
 National Museum of Iraq

Ireland
 Irish Museum of Modern Art
 National Gallery of Ireland
 National Museum of Ireland

Israel
 Israel Museum

Italy
 Bargello National Museum (Museo Nazionale del Bargello)
 Galleria degli Uffizi
 National Archeological Museum of Naples (Museo Archeologico Nazionale di Napoli)
 National Archaeological Museum of Nuoro
 National Etruscan Museum (Museo Nazionale Etrusco)
 National Gallery of Ancient Art (Galleria Nazionale d'Arte Antica)
 National Gallery of Modern Art (Galleria Nazionale d'Arte Moderna)
 National Museum of Capodimonte (Museo Nazionale di Capodimonte)
 National Museum of Magna Grecia (Museo Nazionale della Magna Grecia)
 National Museum of Oriental Art
 National Museum of Rome
 Pinacoteca di Brera

Japan
 National Institutes for Cultural Heritage
 Tokyo National Museum
 Kyoto National Museum 
 Nara National Museum 
 Kyushu National Museum 
 Independent Administrative Institution National Museum of Art
 National Museum of Modern Art, Tokyo
 National Museum of Modern Art, Kyoto
 National Museum of Western Art
 National Museum of Art, Osaka 
 National Art Center, Tokyo
 National Film Archive of Japan
 National Museum of Nature and Science
 National Museum of Ethnology (Japan)
 National Museum of Japanese History
 National Showa Memorial Museum

Kenya
 National Museums of Kenya

Korea
 National Museum of Korea
 Buyeo National Museum 
 Cheongju National Museum
 Chuncheon National Museum
 Daegu National Museum
 Gimhae National Museum
 Gongju National Museum
 Gwangju National Museum
 Gyeongju National Museum
 Jeju National Museum
 Jeonju National Museum
 Jinju National Museum
 National Folk Museum of Korea
 National Palace Museum of Korea

Kuwait
 Al-Hashemi-II Marine Museum in Kuwait City
 Kuwait National Museum
 Kuwait Science and Natural History Museum

Latvia
 Latvian National Museum of Art

Lebanon
 National Museum of Beirut

Libya

Liechtenstein 

 Liechtenstein National Museum

Lithuania

 National Museum of Lithuania

Luxembourg
 National Museum of History and Art, in Luxembourg City
 National Museum of Military History, in Diekirch
 National Museum of Natural History, in Luxembourg City

Macau 
 Museum of Macau

Malaysia
 Muzium Negara
Muzium Sejarah Nasional

Maldives
 National Museum

Mali
 National Museum of Mali

Malta
 National Museum of Archaeology
 National Museum of Ethnography
 National Museum of Fine Arts
 National Museum of Natural History
 National War Museum

Mauritania
 National Museum of Mauritania

Mexico
 Museo Nacional de Antropología (National Museum of Anthropology)
 Museo Nacional de Historia (National Museum of History)

Myanmar
 National Museum Nay Pyi Taw
 National Museum of Myanmar

Namibia
 National Museum of Namibia
 Alte Feste
 Owela Museum
 Independence Memorial Museum

Nepal
 National Museum of Nepal

Netherlands
 Dordrechts Museum
 EYE Film Institute Netherlands
 Huis Doorn
 Kröller-Müller Museum
 Loevestein
 Mauritshuis
 Muiderslot
 Museum Boerhaave
 Museum Catharijneconvent
 Museum Meermanno
 Museum Mesdag
 Museum Volkenkunde
 National Museum of Ethnology
 Naturalis
 Nederlands Scheepvaartmuseum
 Paleis het Loo
 Rijksmuseum Amsterdam
 Rijksmuseum Twenthe
 Rijksmuseum van Oudheden
 Openluchtmuseum
 Van Gogh Museum
 Zuiderzeemuseum

New Zealand
 Museum of New Zealand Te Papa Tongarewa - commonly known as Te Papa or Our Place in English translation

Niger
 Musée National Boubou Hama, formerly National Museum of Niger

Norway
 National Museum of Art, Architecture and Design

Pakistan
 National Museum of Pakistan, Karachi

Palau
 Belau National Museum, Koror

Papua New Guinea
 Papua New Guinea National Museum and Art Gallery, Port Moresby

Peru
 National Museum of Peru
 Museum of the Nation
 National Museum of the Archaeology, Anthropology, and History of Peru
 Lima Art Museum

Philippines
The National Museum of the Philippines (NMP), a government organization, operates several national museums, including:

The National Museum Complex in Manila which consist of central museums of the NMP namely:
National Museum of Anthropology
National Museum of Fine Arts
National Museum of Natural History

The NMP also operates satellite museums such as:
National Museum Dumaguete
National Museum Western Visayas

Poland

 National Museum, Kraków 
 National Museum, Gdańsk 
 National Maritime Museum, Gdańsk
 National Museum, Lublin
 National Museum, Poznań 
 National Museum, Szczecin
 National Museum, Warsaw 
 National Museum, Wrocław

Portugal
 Air Museum, part of the Portuguese Air Force
 Grão Vasco National Museum
 Porto Military Museum, part of the Portuguese Army
 National Archaeology Museum
 National Azulejo Museum
 National Coach Museum
 National Museum of Ancient Art
 National Museum of Contemporary Art of Chiado
 National Museum of Costume and Fashion
 National Museum of Ethnology, it includes the Popular Art Museum
 National Museum of Natural History and Science, part of the University of Lisbon
 National Museum Machado de Castro 
 National Museum Soares dos Reis
 National Music Museum
 National Railway Museum
 National Theatre and Dance Museum 
 Navy Museum, part of the Portuguese Navy

Qatar
 Qatar National Museum

Romania
 ASTRA Museum of Traditional Folk Civilization (Muzeul Civilizaţiei Populare Tradiţionale)
 ASTRA Museum of Transylvanian Civilisation (Muzeul Civilizaţiei Transilvane)
 Brukenthal National Museum 
 Emil Sigerus Museum of Saxon Ethnography and Folk Art (Muzeul de Etnografie şi Artă Populară Săsească ASTRA) 
 Franz Binder Museum of Universal Ethnography (Muzeul de Etnografie Universală ASTRA) 
 National History Museum of Romania
 National Military Museum, Romania (Muzeul Militar Naţional)
 National Museum of Art of Romania

Russia
 State Historical Museum
 Russian Museum

Saudi Arabia
 National Museum of Saudi Arabia

Serbia
 National Museum of Serbia

Sierra Leone
 Sierra Leone National Museum

Singapore
 National Museum of Singapore

Slovakia
 Slovak National Museum
Slovak National History Museum

Somalia
 National Museum of Somalia

South Africa
 South African National Museum of Military History
 Iziko South African Museum
 Ditsong Museums of South Africa
includes Ditsong National Museum of Natural History  and Ditsong National Museum of Cultural History
 National Museum, Bloemfontein
 National Afrikaans Literary Museum and Research Centre

South Sudan
 South Sudan National Museum

Spain
 National Archaeological Museum, Madrid
 Cervantes' House Museum, Valladolid
 Museum of the Royal Mint, Madrid
 Museum Cerralbo, Madrid
 Aeronautical and Astronautical Museum, Madrid
 Museum of the Americas, Madrid
 Museum of the Army, Toledo
 Catalonia Railway Museum, Vilanova i la Geltrú (Barcelona)
 Railway Museum, Madrid
 El Greco Museum, Toledo
 National Museum of Romanticism, Madrid
 Museum of Garment - Ethnologic Heritage Research Center, Madrid
 Geomineral Museum, Madrid
 Lázaro Galdiano Museum, Madrid
 Queen Sofía Art Center National Museum, Madrid
 National Museum of Anthropology, Madrid
 National Museum of Subaquatic Archaeology, Cartagena (Murcia)
 National Museum of Roman Art, Mérida (Badajoz)
 National Museum of Decorative Arts, Madrid
 González Martí National Museum of Ceramics and Decorative Arts, Valencia
 National Museum of Science and Technology, La Coruña and Alcobendas (Madrid)
 National Museum of Natural Sciences, Madrid
 National Museum of Sculpture, Valladolid
 Prado National Museum, Madrid
 National Museum of Theatre, Almagro (Ciudad Real)
 Thyssen-Bornemisza National Museum, Madrid
 National Museum and Research Center of Altamira, Santillana del Mar (Cantabria)
 Naval Museum, Madrid
 Sephardic Museum, Toledo
 Sorolla Museum, Madrid
 Royal Botanical Garden, Madrid

Catalonia   
 National Art Museum of Catalonia (MNAC), Barcelona
 National Museum of Science and Industry of Catalonia (mNACTEC), Terrassa
 Archaeological Museum of Catalonia (MAC), Barcelona, Empúries, Girona, Olèrdola and Ullastret

Sri Lanka
 National Museum of Colombo
 National Museum Galle
 National Museum Kandy
 National Museum Maritime
 National Museum Ratnapura

Sudan
 National Museum of Sudan

Suriname 
 Surinaams Museum

Sweden
 Nationalmuseum

Switzerland
 Swiss National Museum (Landesmuseum)

Syria
 National Museum of Damascus

Taiwan
 Chunghwa Postal Museum
 National Museum of History
 National Museum of Marine Biology and Aquarium
 National Museum of Marine Science and Technology
 National Museum of Natural Science
 National Museum of Prehistory
 National Museum of Taiwan History
 National Museum of Taiwan Literature
 National Palace Museum
 National Radio Museum
 National Science and Technology Museum
 National Taiwan Museum
 National Taiwan Museum of Fine Arts
 Republic of China Air Force Museum
 Republic of China Armed Forces Museum
 Southern Branch of the National Palace Museum

Tajikistan
 Tajikistan National Museum

Thailand

Trinidad and Tobago
 National Museum and Art Gallery

Turks and Caicos
 Turks and Caicos National Museum

Ukraine
 Aivazovsky National Art Gallery
 Lviv National Art Gallery
 Lviv National Museum
 Museum of The History of Ukraine in World War II
 National Art Museum of Ukraine
 National Historical Museum of Ukraine
 National Museum-Preserve "Battle for Kyiv 1943"
 Ukrainian National Chornobyl Museum

United Kingdom

England
Sponsored by the Department for Digital, Culture, Media and Sport
 British Museum
 Victoria & Albert Museum
 Victoria and Albert Museum in London
 V&A Museum of Childhood in London
 Also see 'Scotland' below
 Horniman Museum and Gardens 
 Imperial War Museum
 Imperial War Museum London
 Imperial War Museum Duxford
 HMS Belfast (C35)
 Churchill War Rooms
 Imperial War Museum North
 National Museums Liverpool
 World Museum
 Walker Art Gallery
 Merseyside Maritime Museum
 The Piermaster's House
 International Slavery Museum
 Lady Lever Art Gallery
 Sudley House
 Museum of Liverpool
 National Conservation Centre
 Royal Armouries
 Royal Armouries Museum in Leeds
 Tower of London in London
 Fort Nelson in Portsmouth
 Science Museum Group
 The Science Museum in South Kensington, London
 The Science and Industry Museum in Manchester
 The National Railway Museum in York
 The National Railway Museum Shildon in County Durham ("Locomotion")
 The National Science and Media Museum (formerly the National Museum of Photography, Film and Television) in Bradford, and
 The Science Museum at Wroughton in Swindon, Wiltshire.
 Sir John Soane's Museum
 Tate
 The Box, Plymouth in Plymouth, Devon
 Wallace Collection
 Natural History Museum, London
 Natural History Museum at Tring, Tring
 Geffrye Museum 
National Coal Mining Museum for England, Wakefield 
 National Gallery
 National Portrait Gallery
 Royal Museums Greenwich

Sponsored by Ministry of Defence
 National Army Museum
 National Museum of the Royal Navy
 Royal Air Force Museum

Sponsored by the Home Office
 Border Force National Museum

Northern Ireland
 Armagh County Museum
 Ulster-American Folk Park
 Ulster Folk and Transport Museum
 Ulster Museum

Scotland
 National Museums Scotland
 National Museum of Costume
 National Museum of Flight
 National Museum of Rural Life 
 National War Museum of Scotland
 Museum of Scotland
 Royal Museum
 V&A Dundee

Wales
 Big Pit National Coal Museum 
 National Museum Cardiff 
 National Museum Wales
 National Roman Legionary Museum 
 National Slate Museum
 National Waterfront Museum  
 National Woollen Museum 
 St Fagans National History Museum

United States

 Atomic/Nuclear
 National Atomic Testing Museum
 National Museum of Nuclear Science & History
 Department of Defense:
 Air Force:
 Air Force Armament Museum
 Air Mobility Command Museum 
 National Museum of the United States Air Force
 Museum of Aviation
 Strategic Air and Space Museum
 Army:
 National Museum of Health and Medicine 
 National Museum of the United States Army
 Rock Island Arsenal Museum
 West Point Museum
 Navy:
 National Museum of the Marine Corps 
 National Museum of the United States Navy
 National Naval Aviation Museum
 National Museum of the American Sailor
 National Navy UDT-SEAL Museum
 Naval War College Museum
 Submarine Force Library and Museum
 National Security Agency:
 National Cryptologic Museum
 Central Intelligence Agency:
 CIA Museum
 Department of Homeland Security
 United States Coast Guard Museum
 National Gallery of Art
 Smithsonian Institution: 
American Art Museum
 Anacostia Community Museum
 Arts and Industries Building
 Cooper Hewitt, Smithsonian Design Museum
 Freer Gallery of Art
 Hirshhorn Museum and Sculpture Garden
 National Air and Space Museum
 Steven F. Udvar-Hazy Center
 National Museum of African American History and Culture 
 National Museum of African Art 
 National Museum of the American Indian 
 National Museum of American History
 National Museum of Natural History 
 National Portrait Gallery
 National Postal Museum
 National Zoological Park

 Presidential library system
Herbert Hoover Presidential Library and Museum
 Franklin D. Roosevelt Presidential Library and Museum
 Harry S. Truman Presidential Library and Museum
 Dwight D. Eisenhower Presidential Library, Museum and Boyhood Home
 John F. Kennedy Presidential Library and Museum
 Lyndon Baines Johnson Library and Museum
 Richard Nixon Presidential Library and Museum
 Gerald R. Ford Museum
 Jimmy Carter Library and Museum
 Ronald Reagan Presidential Library
 George H. W. Bush Presidential Library
 Clinton Presidential Center
 George W. Bush Presidential Center
 Transportation
 Mariners' Museum and Park - National Maritime Museum 
 National Railroad Museum
 War Museums/Memorials
National Veterans Memorial and Museum
 National Civil War Museum
 National Museum of the Pacific War
 National World War I Museum
 National World War II Museum
 Other
National Museum of Wildlife Art
 National Civil Rights Museum
 National Constitution Center
 National Museum of Dentistry
 National Mining Hall of Fame and Museum
 National Building Museum
 National Quilt Museum
 National Nordic Museum
 National Law Enforcement Museum
 National Airmail Museum
 National American Museum of Visionary Art

See also
 List of museums
 List of national archives
 List of national libraries
 List of national galleries

References

Further reading 

 

national museums